Charley White who was born Charles Anchowitz on 25 March 1891 in Liverpool, England was considered one of the best boxers of his era.  White fought from 1906 until 1923.  He made one ill-fated comeback attempt in 1930, but was ignominiously TKOed by Henry Perlick, a nondescript fighter who would not have stood a chance against White in his prime.  White boxed in the United States for his entire career making his home in Chicago at the age of seven. Under current rules, his championship bouts with Willie Ritchie and Freddie Welsh, where he dealt more blows would have had him winning the bouts on points and taking the world lightweight championship, but when he fought only a knockout would have allowed him to win the match and the title.  In 1958, Nat Fleischer, publisher of The Ring magazine rated Charley White the tenth greatest lightweight of all time.

Biography
In a nineteen year career, White fought the top contenders and champions in each of three weight classes: Abe Attell, Johnny Kilbane, and Johnny Dundee in the featherweight division; Ad Walgast, Willie Ritchie, Freddie Welsh, Benny Leonard and Rocky Kansas in the lightweight division; and Jack Britton, and Ted Kid Lewis in the welterweight division, for a total of ten champion opponents.

Early life and career
Charles Anchowitz was born in Liverpool England to Jewish parents who brought him to America at the age of seven.  His father, a struggling tailor from Russia, settled the family in the Jewish Ghetto on Chicago's West Side, the home of many great Jewish boxers including Barney Ross and Harry Harris.  At thirteen, Charles contracted tuberculosis, a not uncommon illness in the Chicago ghetto, and sustained damage to one of his lungs.  His father sent him to Chicago's O'Connell's Sports Club to build up his strength.  After gaining weight and working out, Charles took up boxing at the club and within eighteen months was diagnosed free from tuberculosis.  At fifteen, Anchowitz changed his name to White and began his professional boxing career.  His brothers Jack White and Billy Wagner were also professional boxers.  Impressively, in his career, White fought world champions a total of twenty-two times.

Challenges for the feather, and light titles
Although White never won a world championship, he fought for the title several times.  His first fight against a World Champion came at age eighteen against the legendary Jewish world featherweight champion Abe Attell on 6 December 1909 in Memphis.  Attell won the 8 round "newspaper decision" but had to extend himself to the limit to win over White.  White landed rights and lefts to the champion's head and body, but Attell surpassed White in his use of short jabs in the infighting.  The decision was unpopular with the crowd.  White lost to Attell again on 16 September 1910 at the Hippodrome in Milwaukee, but got in several potent blows against a far more experienced fighter.  Attell danced around the ring to gain an angle of advantage, but White showed a solid defense.  As they fought at catchweights, Attell's featherweight crown was not at risk.

White lost to future champion Johnny Kilbane in a twelve round bout before 2,200 at Grey's Armory in Cleveland on 23 December 1911. The match was a contest between two of the leading contenders for the world featherweight crown.  Both boxers showed great speed and technique.  Kilbane would take the world featherweight title on 22 February 1912, and hold it for eleven years.   

On 4 July 1913, White valiantly lost to future Welterweight Champion Jack Britton in an eighteen round technical knockout in New Orleans, Louisiana.  White may have performed better in the closing rounds if not having broken a bone in his hand in the eighth round.  The injury was acquired when White dealt a strong blow to Britton's face.  Regardless of his injury, he put up an impressive defense, staying on his feet another ten rounds, before the referee called the bout. Britton gained an advantage from a longer reach, and from White's loss of his left hand, which dealt his left hook, one of his most powerful and effective blows.

On 19 December 1913, White defeated Ad Wolgast former world lightweight champion in a ten round newspaper decision at Dreamland Park in Milwaukee.  White dominated the bout with his left hook, but Wolgast was not quite the boxer who earlier held the championship and his punches lacked steam.  He had taken the world lightweight champion against Mexican Joe Rivers in July 1912, but lost it in November 1912 to Willie Ritchie.  Had points determined the outcome of the fight, and if Wolgast had still held the title, White would have taken the world lightweight championship.

World light  title attempt, Willie Ritchie, May, 1914
On 26 May 1914, White fought reigning champion Willie Ritchie for the World Lightweight Championship in Milwaukee, Wisconsin in a ten round no decision bout.  Though the vast majority of newspapers, including the Milwaukee Free Press believed White had won the match, according to the law of the Wisconsin Boxing Commission, White could only take home the championship by knocking out Ritchie. In one of his most complete victories, The Los Angeles Times wrote that White "defeated the champion (Willie Ritchie) so decisively that even the most prejudiced person in the world could not fail to see that he was master." Ritchie himself admitted that "White did not beat him by a wide margin", implying that his opponent had won the fight.  The Boston Globe gave White five rounds, with only two for Ritchie, noting that White had nearly knocked out Richie in the first round. In the final rounds, particularly the tenth, Ritchie was taking most of the punishment, as White increased his winning margin. White's greatest error was his inability to follow up and end the fight after he staggered Ritchie in the first round, but when fighting a world champion a follow-up knockout can be a challenging task. In the second and third, Ritchie was able to ward off the blows of White, and some reporters credited him with only these two rounds. White was said to look far fresher at the end than Ritchie who had both eyes nearly closed, and suffered from serious damage to his face and nose.

White lost a ten round decision to exceptional New York Jewish boxing phenomenon Leach Cross on 25 March 1915, at the shrine of East coast boxing, Madison Square Garden.  Cross's trademark crouch, and ability to bore in regardless of the cost, had White baffled at times during the bout, which included constant action throughout.  Both boxers felt the effect of their battle by the end of the match. Cross never earned a world title, but fought the best in his career, including most of the feather and lightweight champions White fought himself.

On 21 July 1915, White lost to fellow British and Jewish lightweight Ted "Kid" Lewis, in a newspaper decision at St. Nicholas Rink in New York.  Other newspapers considered the fight a draw, but admitted Lewis won at least half the rounds.  Once again White's best weapon was his left hook which saved him in the tenth when it landed on Lewis's jaw.  Lewis, with his dancing attack common to many English boxers of the time, landed more blows, but White's left hooks, though few in number, landed with more force and affected Lewis more.  White made a better showing in the two final rounds.

World light title attempt, Freddie Welsh, May, 1916

White also unsuccessfully challenged reigning lightweight champion Freddie Welsh for his title.  White possessed a lethal left hook, but seemed to lack the killer instinct.  This fault cost him in his 4 September 1916 attempt to wrest the crown from Welsh at Colorado Springs.

White appeared to have Welsh ready for a knockout in the eleventh, twelfth and thirteenth rounds of their 1916 match, but failed to follow up his advantage.  Welsh backpedaled against the aggressive attack of White, who scored with hooks to the head and body, when the two were not clinching.  The extremely unpopular 20-round decision was awarded to Welsh, though White appeared to land more blows, causing a small riot to break out in the crowd.  Both boxers clinched for a large part of the bout, which also incensed the crowd.  As White threw more punches and did more damage in the fight, he would have been awarded the world lightweight championship by today's rules, winning on points.  In 1916, however, a challenger to the lightweight crown had to knockout the title holder, and White did not, losing his chance to be remembered as one of boxing's best.

Light title bout with Benny Leonard
On 5 July 1920, White lost to Jewish boxer and exceptional lightweight champion, Benny Leonard, in a ninth round knockout before an audience of 12,000 at Benton Harbor, Michigan.  The fight was a careful battle of boxing strategy, and White wielded the potential for stronger punching with his left hook.  Leonard may have won largely due to his faster reaction time, and reflexes against an opponent who was nearly his equal at times. He showed better speed and agility, and used footwork to gain advantages in the angle of his attack.  The hard punching White knocked Leonard out of the ring in the fifth round with his left hook, but failed to follow up. Ken Blady wrote that Leonard was helped up by his brother Charley, and did not arise til the count of nine.  Once again White had his opponent down, but as famed sportswriter of the day Hype Igoe wrote "White is like the artist who can't resist the temptation of stepping back and admiring his incompleted work."   Leonard recovered and by the ninth, White was down five times, finally landing on the canvas for the count from a right cross from Leonard. Leonard had been looking for an opening since the eighth round, and found it after he opened White up with his left jab that led him to deal the final right cross in the ninth.  For the first time in nearly 150 bouts, an opponent had knocked out White.  Though he had continued to train, Leonard, the incomparable champion, may have performed better had he not had nearly five months off from prizefighting, living in Hollywood.  It was one of White's better showings, as he dominated the infighting, and appeared to have thrown more punches, but he fought against an opponent who simply could not be beaten.  White paid for his hesitation when Leonard KOed him in the 9th round.

Life after boxing and honors
After retiring from boxing, White ran a successful gym that catered to wealthy women in Chicago's Loop District.  He subsequently relocated to Los Angeles, and trained movie actors.  In his 60s he was believed to have suffered from dementia or alzheimer's, likely from his boxing.

White died on 24 July 1959 near Los Angeles at the California State Hospital, where he had been placed three years earlier.  His ring record consists of 89 wins (59 KOs), 17 losses, 5 draws, 59 No Decisions (news reports on the No Decisions yield an additional 30 wins, 21 losses, and 8 draws), and 2 No Contests.  White was named to the Ring Magazine's list of 100 greatest punchers of all time, probably for his noted skill with the left hook.

Professional boxing record
All information in this section is derived from BoxRec, unless otherwise stated.

Official record

All newspaper decisions are officially regarded as “no decision” bouts and are not counted to the win/loss/draw column.

Unofficial record

Record with the inclusion of newspaper decisions to the win/loss/draw column.

References

External links
 https://web.archive.org/web/20150406031913/http://boxrec.com/list_bouts.php?human_id=11925&cat=boxer
 http://www.boxrec.com/media/index.php?title=Human:11925

1891 births
English Jews
Jewish boxers
Boxers from Illinois
English male boxers
Featherweight boxers
Lightweight boxers
1959 deaths